This is a list of articles describing traditional music styles that incorporate the accordion, alphabetized by assumed region of origin.

Note that immigration has affected many styles: e.g. for the South American styles of traditional music, German and Czech immigrants arrived with accordions (usually button boxes) and the new instruments were incorporated into the local traditional music.

Traditional music styles incorporating the accordion

{| class="wikitable" border="1"
|-
! Region
! Style name
! Main accordion type (if applicable)
|-
| Argentina
| Tango; Chamamé, Cuarteto, Polka 
| Bandoneon; Diatonic button accordion
|-
| Austria
| Schrammelmusik
| Schrammelharmonika (Chromatic button accordion)
|-
| The Bahamas
| Rake-and-scrape
| Diatonic button accordion
|-
| Basque Country
| Basque music
| Trikitixa (Diatonic button accordion)
|-
| Bohemia
| Polka
| 
|-
| Bolivia
| Huayno, Cueca
| 
|-
| Brazil
| Forró (in northeastern Brazil); Rio Grande do Sul's traditional music, which include the following genres: Milonga, Chamamé, Polca, Tango, Valsa, Xote, Rasguido Doble, Vanera, Bugio, Chamarra and Rancheira; Sertanejo
| Diatonic button accordion, Piano accordion, Bandoneon
|-
| Brittany
| Breton 'Fest Noz' music
| Diatonic button accordion, Chromatic Button Accordion C System
|-
| Bulgaria
| Horo "Хоро"
|-
| Canada
| French-Canadian music, Music of Newfoundland and Labrador
| 
|-
| Canada
| Inuit music
| Diatonic button accordion
|-
| Cape Verde
| Funaná
|-
| Catalonia
| Catalan folk music
| Diatonic button accordion (Marimon style)
|-
| Colombia
| Cumbia, Vallenato, Pasillo
| Diatonic button accordion
|-
| Caucasus
| Lezginka
|
|-
| Chile
| Cueca
| Piano accordion
|-
| Dominican Republic
| Merengue
| Diatonic button accordion
|-
| Eastern Europe
| Klezmer
|
|-
| England
| Sea shanty
| 
|-
| Eastern Europe
| Music of Southeastern Europe
| Chromatic Button Accordion B System
|-
| Egypt
| Baladi
| 
|-
| England
| Morris Dancing, Sea shanty
| Diatonic button accordion (melodeon)
|-
| France
| Bal-musette , Chanson réaliste
| Diatonic button accordion
|-
| Greece
| Rebetiko
| 
|-
| Honduras
| Corrido, Cumbia
|
|-

| Ireland (Éire)
| Irish traditional music (ceol, "trad")
| B/C,C#/D (23 key, 8 bass button accordion)
|-
| Italy
| Saltarello
| Organetto (2, 4, and 8 Bass Diatonic)
|-
| Italy
| Tarantella
| Organetto (2, 4, and 8 Bass Diatonic)
|-
| Japan
| Ryūkōka
|-
| Korea
| Trot music
| 
|-
| Madagascar
| Salegy, Batrelaky
| 
|-
| Mexico
| Norteño, Corrido, Ranchera, Cumbia
| 
|-
| Netherlands
| Levenslied
| 
|-
| Panama
| Tamborito, Cumbia
| 
|-
| Paraguay
| Chamamé
| 
|-
| Peru
| Huayno, Vals
| 
|-
| Portugal
| Pimba
| 
|-
| Romania
| Czardas, Generic traditional music not specified by name.
|
|-
| Russia
| Generic traditional music not specified by name.
|
|-
| Scotland
| Country Dance, Bothy Band 
| Piano accordion, Diatonic Button Accordion C,C#,D
|-
| Spain
| Pasodoble, Jota
| 
|-
| Sonoran Desert
| Chicken scratch
| 
|-
| South Africa
| Boeremusiek 
| Concertina, Piano accordion
|-
| Switzerland
| Yodel, Generic traditional music not specified by name.
|
|-
| Thailand
| Mor lam
|
|-
| Thailand
| Luk thung
|
|-
| Turks and Caicos
| Ripsaw music
|
|-
| United States of America
| Cajun music
| Diatonic button accordion
|-
| United States of America
| Polka
| Diatonic button accordion Piano accordion
|-
| United States of America
| Tejano
| 
|-
| United States of America
| Western music
| Piano accordion Diatonic button accordion
|-
| United States of America
| Zydeco
| 
|-
| Uruguay
| Chamarrita, Milonga. Polca, Ranchera, Tango, Vanera, Xote
| Bandoneon; Diatonic button accordion (verdulera), Piano accordion (acordeona)
|-
| Venezuela
| Joropo
| 
|-
| Various countries
| Generic traditional music not specified by name, such as Swiss folk music, etc., that can be any one of the entries in the list of cultural and regional genres of music.
| Various types (Button accordion or Piano accordion)
|-
|}

Accordion
A